The Beautiful City is a 1925 American silent drama film directed by Kenneth Webb and starring Richard Barthelmess, Dorothy Gish, and William Powell. For their mother's sake, a man takes the blame for a robbery committed by his brother and his brother's gangster boss.

Plot
As described in a film magazine review, Tony, a young Italian flower vendor who is in love with Mollie, a young Irish neighbor woman, becomes involved in a series of dangerous events by trying to reclaim his brother, who has fallen under the influence of a gangster-theatre manager. After hard fighting, the youth’s brother is turned from evil. Then the flower seller learns the beauty of his city and finds happiness with the young woman.

Cast
 Richard Barthelmess as Tony Gillardi
 Dorothy Gish as Mollie
 William Powell as Nick Di Silva
 Frank Puglia as Carlo Gillardi
 Florence Auer as Mama Gillardi

Reception
Mordaunt Hall gave a generally unfavorable review in The New York Times, calling The Beautiful City "quite a disappointing production. ... the story would have to be greatly improved to make it entertaining." However, he did note that, "William Powell makes the villainy as impressive as possible."

Preservation
With no prints of The Beautiful City located in any film archives, it is a lost film.

References

External links

Still with Richard Barthelmess at gettyimages.com

American black-and-white films
American crime drama films
American silent feature films
Films set in New York City
1925 crime drama films
1925 films
1920s American films
Silent American drama films